is a Japanese manga series written and illustrated by Michi Urushihara. It was serialized in Shogakukan's seinen manga magazine Monthly Ikki from May 2010 to January 2014, with its chapters collected in four tankōbon volumes.

Publication
Shogakukan collected its chapters in five tankōbon volumes, released from January 28, 2011, to March 28, 2014.

Volume list

See also
Arigoke, another manga series by the same author

References

Further reading

External links
 

Horror anime and manga
Romance anime and manga
Seinen manga
Shogakukan manga